BlacKkKlansman is a 2018 American biographical black comedy crime film directed by Spike Lee and written by Charlie Wachtel, David Rabinowitz, Kevin Willmott and Lee, based on the 2014 memoir Black Klansman by Ron Stallworth. The film stars John David Washington as Stallworth, along with Adam Driver, Laura Harrier, and Topher Grace. Set in the 1970s in Colorado Springs, Colorado, the plot follows the first African-American detective in the city's police department as he sets out to infiltrate and expose the local Ku Klux Klan chapter.

The film was produced by Spike Lee, Raymond Mansfield, Shaun Redick, Sean McKittrick, Jason Blum, and Jordan Peele. QC Entertainment purchased the film rights to the book in 2015. Lee signed on as director in September 2017. Much of the cast joined the following month, and filming began in New York State.

BlacKkKlansman premiered on May 14, 2018, at the Cannes Film Festival, where it won the Grand Prix. It was theatrically released in the United States on August 10, 2018, a day before the first anniversary of the Unite the Right rally. The film received acclaim from critics, who praised Lee's direction, the performances (particularly of Washington and Driver) and timely themes, as well as noting it as a return to form for Lee. It received six nominations at the 91st Academy Awards, including Best Picture, Best Director (Lee's first directing nomination), and Best Supporting Actor for Driver, and won for Best Adapted Screenplay, making it Lee's first competitive Academy Award. The American Film Institute also selected it as one of the top 10 films of 2018, and at the 76th Golden Globe Awards it earned four nominations, including Best Motion Picture – Drama.

Plot
In 1972, Ron Stallworth is hired as the first black officer in the Colorado Springs Police Department. Assigned to work in the records room, he tires of being bullied and applies to be an undercover officer. He is assigned to infiltrate a local rally where national civil rights leader Kwame Ture (a.k.a. Stokely Carmichael) is speaking. At the rally, Stallworth meets Patrice Dumas, president of the Black Student Union at Colorado College. While taking Ture to his hotel, Dumas is stopped by patrolman Andy Landers, a racist officer in Stallworth's precinct, who threatens Ture and gropes Dumas.

Following the rally, Stallworth is reassigned to the intelligence division. After reading about a local division of the Ku Klux Klan in the newspaper, he calls posing as white. He speaks with Walter Breachway, the president of the Colorado Springs chapter, but soon realizes that not only did he use his real name, but he must also meet the Klan members. Stallworth recruits his Jewish coworker, Flip Zimmerman, to impersonate him and meet the KKK members while he continues posing as white on the phone. Under Stallworth's identity, Zimmerman meets Breachway, the slightly more reckless and unstable Felix Kendrickson (and later his wife Connie), and Ivanhoe, who cryptically refers to an upcoming terrorist attack.

Calling Ku Klux Klan headquarters in Louisiana to expedite his membership, Stallworth begins regular phone conversations with Grand Wizard David Duke. Kendrickson suspects Zimmerman of being Jewish and tries to force him to take a polygraph test at gunpoint, but Stallworth, overhearing everything on the wire Zimmerman is wearing, breaks the Kendricksons' kitchen window as a distraction. Stallworth begins dating Dumas without telling her that he is a police officer. After passing information to the Army CID about active-duty members, he learns from an FBI agent that two members are personnel stationed at NORAD.

Duke visits Colorado Springs for Stallworth's induction into the Klan. Over the real Stallworth's protests, he is assigned to a protection detail for Duke. Once Zimmerman, masquerading as Stallworth, is initiated, Connie Kendrickson leaves the ceremony to place an explosive device at a local civil rights rally. The real Stallworth realizes her intentions and alerts local police officers. When Connie notices a heavy police presence at the rally, she puts Felix's backup plan into action and plants the device at Patrice's house, leaving it under her car when it will not fit into the mailbox. Stallworth tackles her as she tries to flee, but uniformed officers detain and beat him despite his protests that he is working undercover.

The bombmaker, Walker, recognizes Zimmerman from a prior arrest and informs Felix. He, Felix, and Ivanhoe drive to the house and park next to Patrice's car without realizing that the device is hidden underneath. When they detonate it, the explosion kills all three. Zimmerman arrives, frees Stallworth, and arrests Connie. While Stallworth is celebrating the closed case that night with Dumas, Landers arrives and harasses the two, remorselessly admitting to his assault on Dumas; Stallworth then reveals he is wearing a wire, and Police Chief Bridges arrives and arrests Landers for police brutality.

Bridges congratulates the team for their success but orders them to end their investigation and destroy the records. Stallworth receives a call from Duke, and he insultingly tells Duke he is black before hanging up. While Dumas and Stallworth discuss their future, they are interrupted by a knock on the door. Through the window in the hallway, they see a flaming cross on a hillside surrounded by KKK members. The film then cuts to actual footage of the 2017 Unite the Right rally, the hit and run that followed, and where a still-respected David Duke is a speaker, and ends with a dedication to Heather Heyer (the only person killed in the attack), and an upside-down American flag that fades to black and white.

Cast

Production
In July 2015, screenwriters/co-producers Charlie Wachtel and David Rabinowitz discovered the book Black Klansman by Ron Stallworth. They interviewed Stallworth and wrote a spec screenplay, then pitched the script to producers Shaun Redick and Ray Mansfield. They brought the property to QC Entertainment, which had co-produced the successful 2017 film Get Out. QC again teamed up with Jason Blum's company Blumhouse Productions, and Jordan Peele's company Monkeypaw Productions, to produce the project.

In September of that year, Spike Lee signed on as director and John David Washington was in negotiations to star. The following month, Adam Driver, Laura Harrier, Topher Grace, and Corey Hawkins had joined the cast. In November, Paul Walter Hauser, Jasper Pääkkönen, and Ryan Eggold joined the cast, with Ashlie Atkinson joining a month later.

Filming began in October 2017. Ossining, New York, was one location used in October. Filming locations also included the Rockland County hamlet of Garnerville, New York, where exterior shots of one of the Colorado Springs police stations were filmed.

Harry Belafonte appears in the film recounting the lynching of Jesse Washington; according to Lee, he commanded his crew on the day of filming Belafonte's scene to dress for the occasion in suits and dresses to honor Belafonte.

Lee ends the film with a tribute to anti-fascist counter-protester Heather Heyer, who was killed on August 12, 2017, in the Charlottesville car attack during the Unite the Right rally.

Release

On April 12, 2018, the film was selected to compete for the Palme d'Or at the 2018 Cannes Film Festival, where it premiered on May 14. It opened in the United States on August 10, 2018, which was chosen to coincide with the one-year anniversary of the Charlottesville rally.

Reception

Box office
BlacKkKlansman grossed $49.3 million in the United States and Canada, and $44.1 million in other territories, for a total worldwide gross of $93.4 million, against a production budget of $15 million.

In the United States and Canada, BlacKkKlansman was released, and was projected to gross around $10 million from 1,512 theaters in its opening weekend. It made $3.6 million on its first day (including $670,000 from Thursday night previews). It went on to debut to $10.8 million, finishing fifth at the box office and marking Lee's best opening weekend since Inside Man ($29 million) in 2006. It made $7.4 million in its second weekend and $5.3 million in its third, finishing seventh and eighth, respectively.

Critical response
The website's critical consensus reads, "BlacKkKlansman uses history to offer bitingly trenchant commentary on current events—and brings out some of Spike Lee's hardest-hitting work in decades along the way." On Metacritic, the film has a weighted average score of 83 out of 100, based on 56 critics, indicating "universal acclaim". Audiences polled by CinemaScore gave the film an average grade of "A−" on an A+ to F scale, while PostTrak reported filmgoers gave it an 85% positive score and a 67% "definite recommend".

Peter Bradshaw of The Guardian gave the film three out of five stars, writing: "It's an entertaining spectacle but the brilliant tonal balance in something like Jordan Peele's satire Get Out leaves this looking a little exposed. Yet it responds fiercely, contemptuously to the crassness at the heart of the Trump regime and gleefully pays it back in its own coin". For IndieWire, David Ehrlich gave the film a grade of "B+" and wrote that it is "far more frightening than it is funny", and "packages such weighty and ultra-relevant subjects into the form of a wildly uneven but consistently entertaining night at the movies".

A. O. Scott, writing for The New York Times, saw the film as both political and provocative in opening up discussion on timely subject matter following Charlottesville. He stated, "Committed anti-racists can sit quietly or laugh politely when hateful things are said. Epithets uttered in irony can be repeated in earnest. The most shocking thing about Flip's (Adam Driver's undercover detective role) imposture is how easy it seems, how natural he looks and sounds. This unnerving authenticity is partly testament to Mr. Driver's ability to tuck one performance inside another, but it also testifies to a stark and discomforting truth. Maybe not everyone who is white is a racist, but racism is what makes us white. Don't sleep on this movie."

In his review of the film for Vulture, David Edelstein found the film to be a potent antidote for previous films that Lee sees as unduly supportive of the racist viewpoint in the past, such as Griffith's The Birth of a Nation. Edelstein stated: "Lee himself has a propagandist streak, and he knows nothing ever sold the message of white emasculation and the existential necessity of keeping blacks down as well as Griffith's 1915 film. It revived the Klan and—insult to injury—is still reckoned a landmark of narrative filmmaking. If there were no other reason to make BlackkKlansman, this one would be good enough."

Filmmaker Boots Riley, whose feature film debut Sorry to Bother You also premiered in 2018, criticized the film for its political perspective. While Riley called the craft of the film "masterful" and cited Lee as a major influence on his own work, he felt that the film was dishonestly marketed as a true story and criticized its attempts to "make a cop the protagonist in the fight against racist oppression", when Black Americans face structural racism "from the police on a day-to-day basis". In particular, Riley alleged that the film glossed over Stallworth's time spent working for COINTELPRO to "sabotage a Black radical organization" and objected to the film's choices to portray Stallworth's partner as Jewish and to fictionalize a bombing "to make the police seem like heroes". Lee responded in an interview with The Times on August 24, stating that while his films "have been very critical of the police ... I'm never going to say that all police are corrupt, that all police hate people of color."

Accolades

BlacKkKlansman won the Grand Prix at the Cannes Film Festival. It was subsequently nominated for four Golden Globes, including Best Motion Picture – Drama. Lee was nominated for Outstanding Feature Film by the Directors Guild of America and the producers were nominated for the Producers Guild of America Award for Best Theatrical Motion Picture.

The film was also nominated for four Critics Choice Awards, including Best Picture, seven Satellite Awards, including Best Director for Lee, and is nominated for the Independent Spirit Award for Best Supporting Male for Driver, and three Screen Actors Guild Awards, including Outstanding Male Actor for Washington. The American Film Institute also included it in its Top 10 Films of the Year.

BlacKkKlansman was nominated for six Academy Awards and won Best Adapted Screenplay. Nominations included Best Picture, Lee for Best Director, and Driver for Best Supporting Actor. The film was also nominated for Best Film Editing and composer Terence Blanchard was nominated for Best Original Score.

Historical accuracy

Although based on a true story, the film dramatizes several events:
 
 The investigation occurred between 1978 and 1979, although the film is set in 1972. (David Duke did not become Grand Wizard until 1974, and Stokely Carmichael did not change his name to Kwame Ture until 1978.)
 The true identity of Stallworth's partner remains secret, and was only referred to as "Chuck" in the memoir; he also was not Jewish as depicted in the film. There was also a second white officer ("Jim") who also went undercover alongside Chuck.
 Stallworth and other officers never worked to secretly expose and arrest a racist cop (as depicted in the film), although he does mention in the memoir an officer who shot and killed a young boy but was protected by fellow law enforcement officers. 
 Stallworth did work security, meet, and take a photo with Duke when he visited Colorado, although it was a much more intimate gathering than the large ceremony depicted in the film, and his partner's cover was never blown.
 The bomb plot against the Black Student Union is fictional, although Stallworth noted the local chapter did at one point have plans to attack a local gay bar.
 The character of Patrice is fictional, although Stallworth does mention dating a young woman while doing the investigation.
 Stallworth never called Duke to admit he was actually a black man; Duke did not find out until he was asked to fact-check the story by a reporter in 2006.

See also
 List of black films of the 2010s
 Race (human categorization)

References

External links

 
 
 
 
 
 BlacKkKlansman at History vs. Hollywood

African-American comedy films
American crime comedy films
2010s crime comedy films
Blaxploitation films
Blumhouse Productions films
Cultural depictions of Donald Trump
Films about the Ku Klux Klan
Films based on biographies
Films directed by Spike Lee
Films produced by Jason Blum
Films produced by Jordan Peele
Films scored by Terence Blanchard
Films set in 1972
Films set in 2017
Films set in Colorado
Films shot in New York (state)
Films about antisemitism
Films whose writer won the Best Adapted Screenplay Academy Award
Focus Features films
Legendary Pictures films
Cannes Grand Prix winners
40 Acres and a Mule Filmworks films
2018 independent films
2010s English-language films
2010s American films